The 2018 Incarnate Word Cardinals football team represented the University of the Incarnate Word (UIW) in the 2018 NCAA Division I FCS football season as a member of the Southland Conference. The Cardinals played their home games at Gayle and Tom Benson Stadium in San Antonio, Texas. They were led by first year head coach Eric Morris. They finished the season 6–5, 6–2 in Southland play to win a share of the Southland Conference championship. They received an at-large bid to the FCS Playoffs, where they lost in the first round to Montana State. The Cardinals were set to play the Iowa State Cyclones during the first weekend in December, but the game was cancelled.

Previous season
The Cardinals finished the 2017 season 1–10, 1–7 in Southland play to finish in ninth place.

On November 28, 2017, head coach Larry Kennan was fired. He finished at Incarnate Word with a six-year record of 20–46.

Preseason

Preseason All-Conference Teams
On July 12, 2018, the Southland announced their Preseason All-Conference Teams, with the Cardinals placing one player on the second team.

Offense Second Team
 Kody Edwards – Sr. WR

Preseason Poll
On July 19, 2018, the Southland announced their preseason poll, with the Cardinals predicted to finish in ninth place.

Schedule

Personnel

Coaching staff
Source:

Roster
Source:

Depth chart

Postseason honors
The following Cardinals received postseason honors for the 2018 season:

STATS FCS All-American Third Team
RB  Ra'Quanne Dickens – Senior

Hero Sports All-American Third Team
RB  Ra'Quanne Dickens – Senior

Hero Sports FCS Freshman All-American First Team
QB  Jon Copeland

AFCA Regional Coach of the Year
Eric Morris

Southland Conference Coach of the Year
Eric Morris

Southland Conference Freshman of the Year
QB  Jon Copeland

All–Southland Conference First–Team
RB  Ra'Quanne Dickens – Senior
WR  Phillip Baptiste – Senior
OL  Brandon Floores – Junior
DL  Justin Alexandre – Senior

All–Southland Conference Second–Team
QB  Jon Copeland – Freshman
OL  Terence Hickman II – Junior
LB  Silas Stewart – Senior

All–Southland Conference Honorable Mention
WR  Kody Edwards – Senior
RB  Ameer King – Freshman
DL  Darrius Montgomery – Senior
LB  Mar'kel Cooks – Junior
LB  West Lambert – Junior
DB  Malick Phillips – Sophomore
DB  Louis Otis – Junior

NFLPA Collegiate Bowl Participant
LB  Silas Stewart – Senior

College Gridiorn Showcase All-Star Game Participant
DL  Justin Alexandre – Senior

Game summaries

@ New Mexico

@ North Texas

Stephen F. Austin

@ Abilene Christian

Southeastern Louisiana

@ Lamar

McNeese State

@ Nicholls State

Sam Houston State

@ Central Arkansas

FCS Playoffs

@ Montana State–First Round

Rankings

References

Incarnate Word
Incarnate Word Cardinals football seasons
Southland Conference football champion seasons
Incarnate Word
Incarnate Word Cardinals football